Carry On, San Vicente is the seventh studio album from singer-songwriter Dave Barnes.

Track listing
  "She's The One I Love" - 3:16
  "Carry On, San Vicente" - 3:57
  "Wildflower" - 4:31
  "Glow Like the Moon" - 3:15
  "Sunset, Santa Fe" - 3:46
  "Honey, I'm Coming Home" - 2:53
  "Nothing Like You" - 4:22
  "Need Your Love" - 3:21
  "Wildfire Heart" - 3:53

References

External links

2016 albums
Dave Barnes albums